Expulsion of Poles can refer to:
 Expulsion of Poles by Germany in the 19th and 20th centuries
 Expulsion of Poles by Nazi Germany (1939–1944)

See also
Polish population movements from the USSR:
 Polish population transfers (1944–1946)
 Repatriation of Poles (1955–59)